Bro Hof Slott Golf Club is a golf course located in Upplands-Bro, Sweden, northwest of the capital Stockholm.

The Castle Course opened in 2009. The Nordea Masters, an annual event on the PGA European Tour, was hosted at the venue from 2010 through 2016, except for 2014, when it was hosted at PGA Sweden National.

External links
Bro Hof Slott Golf Club

Golf clubs and courses in Sweden
Sport in Stockholm